Prince Pasquale of Bourbon-Two Sicilies, Count of Bari, full Italian name: Pasquale Baylen Maria del Carmine Giovanni-Battista Vincenzo-Ferreri Michele Arcangel Francesco di Paola Ferdinando Francesco di Assisi Luigi-Re Alfonso Gaetano Giuseppe Pietro Paolo Gennaro Luigi-Gonzaga Giovanni Giuseppe della Croce Gaspare Melchiore Baldassare Alberto Sebastiano Giorgio Venanzio Emanuele Placido Andrea-Avelino Rocco Pacifico Francesco di Geronimo Felice Teziano Ana Filomena Sebazia Lucia Luitgarda Apollina, Principe di Borbone delle Due Sicilie, Conte di Bari (15 September 1852, Caserta Palace, Caserta, Two Sicilies – 21 December 1904, Château de Malmaison, Rueil-Malmaison, France) was the eleventh child of Ferdinand II of the Two Sicilies and his second wife Maria Theresa of Austria.

Early life
Pasquale was a cheerful and playful child, raised with loving care by his mother Maria Theresa. Ferdinand was also affectionate and involved with Pasquale and his siblings. Following the expulsion of the Bourbons from Naples and the Kingdom of the Two Sicilies, Pasquale followed his mother and brothers to Rome where Pope Pius IX hosted the Neapolitan Royal Family at the Quirinal Palace.

Marriage

Pasquale married morganatically to Blanche Marconnay, natural daughter of Henriette de Marconnay, on 20 November 1878 in Clichy, Hauts-de-Seine.

Ancestry

References

Arrigo Petacco, La regina del sud, Milano, Mondadori, 1992. 

1838 births
1886 deaths
People from Caserta
Princes of Bourbon-Two Sicilies
Counts of Bari
Sons of kings